Lala Malik (11 March 1923 – 27 August 1988), known under his pen name Lala Aragami, was a poet, Sufi mystic and spiritual teacher in Kashmir.

Life

He was born on 11 March 1923 in village Aragam in Bandipore district in a poor family. His father was Dawood Malik and mother was called Doulat Deddi. Malik received only primary education. At age of 17, he learnt about Sufism from Shaban Solur. After his death, he was guided in Sufism by Ama Kawa, a Sufi from Charari Sharief.

Malik married a woman named Gasha from the same village. They had one daughter and three sons. He worked as a labourer, milkman and imam. 

He sang Sufi poetry and himself authored numerous poems in Kashmiri language; two books of his poetry have been published, including Kuliyati Lala Aragami (2008). As a Sufi teacher, he attracted followers from across the Kashmir Valley. 

Malik died on 27 August 1988. A shrine built at his ancestral home at Aragam attracts pilgrims, especially on his death anniversary on 6 and 7 May.

References

External links 
 Facebook page

Kashmiri Sufi saints
1923 births
1988 deaths
20th-century Indian poets
Indian male poets
Poets from Jammu and Kashmir
20th-century Indian male writers